The 16th LG Cup began on 13 June 2011 and concluded on 15 February 2012. Jiang Weijie won the title, defeating Lee Chang-ho in the final.  32 players from four countries competed in the final knockout tournament:

Korea (17): Cho Hanseung, Choi Cheol-han, Han Wonggyu, Heo Young-ho, Kang Dongyun, Kim Dongho, Kim Jiseok, Lee Chang-ho, Lee Sedol, Lee Wonyoung, Mok Jin-seok, Park Junghwan, Pak Yeong-hun, Park Jungsang, Park Seunghwa, Won Seong-jin, Yun Junsang
China (10): Chen Yaoye, Gu Li, Jiang Weijie, Kong Jie, Piao Wenyao, Qiu Jun, Tan Xiao, Wang Xi, Xie He, Zhou Heyang
Japan (4): Cho U, Iyama Yuta, Sakai Hideyuki, Yuki Satoshi
Taiwan (1): Chen Shiyuan

Tournament

References

2012 in go
LG Cup (Go)